Misaki Nakayama (born 22 August 2002) is a Japanese professional footballer who plays as a midfielder for WE League club Nojima Stella Kanagawa Sagamihara.

Club career 
Nakayama made her WE League debut on 14 November 2021.

References 

Japanese women's footballers
Living people
2002 births
Women's association football midfielders
Association football people from Kanagawa Prefecture
Nojima Stella Kanagawa Sagamihara players
WE League players